The Doorway is a 2000 American-Irish film. It was made at Roger Corman's studios in Ireland Concorde Anois.

Plot
Four college students occupying the old Van Buren mansion are menaced by demons who've escaped hell through a concealed doorway in the house. To combat the dark forces, the students solicit help from Professor Lamont (Scheider), an expert on the paranormal.  Written and directed by Michael B. Druxman.

Cast
Roy Scheider
Lauren Woodland

References

External links
The Doorway at IMDb
The Doorway at BFI
The Doorway at Letterbox DVD

2000 films
English-language Irish films
Films set in country houses
2000s English-language films